MS Krim was the lead ship of her class of six ocean liners built for the Soviet Union in the late 1920s. The ship was the sole ship of her class to survive the Second World War. She was converted into a training ship in 1966.

Description 
She had a pair of six-cylinder, two-stroke diesel engines, each driving a screw propeller, and the engines were rated at a total of 1,163 nominal horsepower. The ship had a designed capacity of 450 passengers.

Construction and career 
Krim was one of the two ships in the class that was constructed in 1928 at the Friedrich Krupp Germaniawerft shipyard in Kiel, Germany. After completion the ship was assigned to the Black Sea State Shipping Company by Sovtorgflot with its port of registry at Odessa.

References

Bibliography

Krim-class ocean liner
Ships built in Kiel
World War II passenger ships of the Soviet Union
Passenger ships of the Soviet Union